Christiana is a group of three volcanic Greek islands in the Cyclades.
The group is located about 16 km (10 miles) southwest of Santorini and is made up of the islands Christiani (Χριστιανή, the largest one), Eschati (Εσχάτη) and Askania (Ασκανιά) belonging to the same submarine volcanic edifice, which is assumed to have been dormant since the Early Pleistocene.  The island's area is about 2.35 km². All three islands are now uninhabited but on Christiani there are remains of human settlement dating back to Neolithic times.  Christiana islands have been uninhabited since the 1890s and have remained unfarmed since then. As a result, artificial pesticides and fertilizers are absent from this ecosystem. In the mid 1970s, the largest island, Christiani, was considered by NATO as a military base intended to host a missile silo, but this never came to pass. These islands are privately owned and public access is restricted.

References

Further reading 
 Walter L. Friedrich, Santorini: Volcano, Natural History, Mythology, P 14

External links 

 Geography of Santorini
 areal photo of Christiana Islands

Islands of Greece
Cyclades
Islands of the South Aegean
Private islands of Greece